John F. "Jack" Itzel Jr. (November 12, 1924 – December 21, 1966) was an American football fullback who played one season in the NFL, for the Pittsburgh Steelers of the National Football League. He played college football at two different colleges, at Georgetown University for the Georgetown Hoyas football team and at the University of Pittsburgh for the Pittsburgh Panthers football team. He was drafted by the Pittsburgh Steelers in the seventeenth round of the 1945 NFL Draft.

References

1924 births
1966 deaths
Players of American football from Pennsylvania
American football fullbacks
Pittsburgh Steelers players
Pittsburgh Panthers football players
Georgetown Hoyas football players